Tong Yan San Tsuen is a village in the Ping Shan area of Yuen Long District, Hong Kong.

Administration
Tong Yan San Tsuen is one of the 37 villages represented within the Ping Shan Rural Committee. For electoral purposes, Tong Yan San Tsuen is part of the Ping Shan South constituency, which was formerly represented by Leung Tak-ming until July 2021.

History
The  village was  established by Tong Hung-ki in 1932 and was settled  by the Lam and Tong families from Zhongshan, in Guangdong province. After World War II, it was inhabited by immigrants from mainland China, with most  of them speaking a Shanghai dialect.

Features
There is a Yeung Hau Temple in Tong Yan San Tsuen. It was built in 1711. The temple is listed as a Grade III historic building.

References

External links

 Delineation of area of existing village Tong Yan San Tsuen (I) (Ping Shan) for election of resident representative (2019 to 2022)
 Delineation of area of existing village Tong Yan San Tsuen (II) (Ping Shan) for election of resident representative (2019 to 2022)
 Delineation of area of existing village Tong Yan San Tsuen (III) (Ping Shan) for election of resident representative (2019 to 2022)
 Antiquities Advisory Board. Pictures of the Yeung Hau Temple

Villages in Yuen Long District, Hong Kong
Ping Shan